Turchin or Turchyn is a surname. Notable people with the surname include:

 Anastasiya Turchyn (born 1995), Ukrainian judoka
 Carolyn Turchin (born 1945), American magistrate judge
 Danila Turchin (born 1978), Uzbekistani sprint canoer
 Dziamyan Turchyn (born 1985), Belarusian sprint canoer
 Eddie Turchin (1917–1982), American baseball player
 Igor Turchin (fencer) (born 1982), Russian fencer
 Igor Turchin (handball) (1936–1993), Soviet-Ukrainian handball coach
 John Basil Turchin, anglicized name of Ivan Turchaninov (1821–1901), Union Army brigadier general in the American Civil War
 Madame Turchin (1825–1904), general's wife
 Peter Turchin (born 1957), Russian-American biologist
 Valentin Turchin (1931–2010), Soviet cybernetician and computer scientist
 Victor Turchin (born 1955 1955), Ukrainian swimming coach
 Yaryna Turchyn (born 1975), Ukrainian political scientist

See also
 
 
 Turczyn (disambiguation)
 Turchina, a main-belt asteroid
 Turchino Lake, Modena, Emilia-Romagna, Italy
 Turchaninov family, sometimes transliterated as Turchin, a noble family of Don Cossack origin